Dar Kham is a village in Khorramdasht Rural District, in the Central District of Kuhbanan County, Kerman Province, Iran. At the 2006 census, its population was 14, in 5 families.

References 

Populated places in Kuhbanan County